Quota is the first official extended play by the Christian pop punk band Eleventyseven.

The EP was released digitally via the iTunes store and Amazon.com on April 29, 2011. However, it has since been pulled from purchase. It was also released in a physical format but is no longer in print. Later the same year, on October 26, the band released Sugarfist, their fourth full-length album that included five of the six songs from the EP . The Japanese edition of Sugarfist featured all six songs from Quota.

Reception
The EP received positive reviews overall.  Many noted that Eleventyseven was becoming very comfortable with their sound, describing the release as "solid" with a "surprisingly high amount of replay value".

Track listing

Personnel
Eleventyseven
Matt Langston - lead vocals, guitar, synthesizer, programming, producer
Davey Davenport - bass
Johnathan Stephens - drums
Additional production
Kyle Lee - mixing
Nathan Dantzler - mastering
Ronnie Johnson - art direction/design
Courtney Thompson - band photography

Music videos

Notes
The EP marks bassist Davey Davenport's first work with the band, after former bassist Caleb Satterfield left the group to focus on his marriage in mid-2010.
An acoustic version of "Book of Secrets" was released exclusively to the band's street team around the EP's release.

References

2011 EPs
Eleventyseven albums
Electropunk albums
Synth-pop EPs